The Australian two-dollar note was introduced in 1966 due to decimalisation, to replace the £1 note which had similar green colouration. The note was issued from its introduction in 1966 until its replacement by the two-dollar coin in 1988.

Security features
The paper design included a watermark of Captain James Cook in the white field which was also used in the last issue of pound banknotes. There eas a metallic strip, first near the centre of the note, then from 1976 moved to the left side on the obverse of the note.

Replacement by the coin
The two dollar note was replaced by a gold-coloured coin in 1988, due to the longer service life and cost effectiveness of coins. These notes can still be redeemed at face value by the Reserve Bank of Australia and most commercial banks, but numismatics and note collectors may pay a higher price for these notes depending on age and condition.

References

 

Banknotes of Australia
Currencies introduced in 1966
Two-base-unit banknotes
Macarthur family (Australia)